A Naval Inactive Ship Maintenance Facility (NISMF) is a facility owned by the United States Navy as a holding facility for decommissioned naval vessels, pending determination of their final fate. All ships in these facilities are inactive, but some are still on the Naval Vessel Register (NVR), while others have been struck from that Register.

The ships that have been stricken from the NVR are disposed of by one of several means, including foreign military sales transfer, ship donation as a museum or memorial, domestic dismantling and recycling, artificial reefing, or use as a target vessel. Others are retention assets for possible future reactivation, which have been laid up for long-term preservation and are maintained with minimal maintenance (humidity control, corrosion control, flood/fire watch) should they need to be recalled to active duty.

The Navy has been reducing the number of inactive ships, which numbered as many as 195 in 1997, but was down to 49 by the end of 2014.

The Naval Sea Systems Command's Inactive Ships Management Office (INACTSHIPOFF) is based in Portsmouth, Virginia.

There are three NISMFs:
Puget Sound Naval Shipyard – Bremerton, Washington 
Joint Base Pearl Harbor–Hickam – Pearl Harbor, Hawaii 
Philadelphia Naval Shipyard – Philadelphia, Pennsylvania

In addition, parts of the Norfolk Naval Shipyard, Portsmouth, Virginia, South Gate Annex Naval Inactive Ship Maintenance Facility and Puget Sound Naval Shipyard are designated for the storage of inactive nuclear powered vessels.

Inactive ship facilities in Suisun Bay, James River and Beaumont, Texas are owned and operated by the Maritime Administration under the U.S. Department of Transportation.

Vessels moored at NISMFs
Following is a list of vessels currently being stored at the facilities as per the NAVSEA Inactive Ship Inventory dated September 26, 2017 (with exceptions as referenced separately):

Philadelphia, Pennsylvania

Bremerton, Washington

Pearl Harbor, Hawaii

Past Facilities
 United States Naval Station Orange, Orange, Texas (1966-1975)
 Naval Inactive Ship Maintenance Facility Bayonne, Bayonne, New Jersey  
NISMF at Naval Base San Diego, San Diego, California

See also
 National Defense Reserve Fleet
 List of current ships of the United States Navy
 List of Military Sealift Command ships
 List of Ready Reserve Force ships

References

External links
 U.S. Navy Inactive Ships Program Office
 Official List of Inactive U.S. Navy Ships
 Official List of Stricken U.S. Navy Ships
 NavSource Online

United States Navy installations
Ships of the United States Navy